Dolichoderus spinicollis is a species of ant in the genus Dolichoderus. Described by Pierre André Latreille in 1817, the species is endemic to Brazil and Venezuela.

References

Dolichoderus
Hymenoptera of South America
Insects described in 1817